Bob McGuinness (1942-2014) was an Australian rugby league footballer who played in the 1960s.  He played for Western Suburbs in the New South Wales Rugby League (NSWRL) competition.

Background
McGuinness grew up in Homebush and was a Western Suburbs junior before being graded at the age of 18.

Playing career
McGuinness made his first grade debut for Western Suburbs in 1962.  Western Suburbs would go on the reach the grand final that year against St George which was a rematch from the previous seasons decider.  Western Suburbs would go on to lose the match 9–6 at the Sydney Cricket Ground.  In 1963, Western Suburbs reached the grand final for the third consecutive year against St George.  McGuinness played at centre as St George won the match 8–3.  The game was remembered due to the muddy conditions both sets of players had to endure and for St George player Norm Provan and Wests player Arthur Summons embracing at full time.

In the following years, Western Suburbs failed to reach the finals but McGuinness stayed loyal to the club and left at the end of 1968.  McGuinness then joined Port Kembla on the South Coast and later signed with Gerringong with whom he won the 1972 South Coast premiership as captain-coach.

References

1942 births
2014 deaths
Western Suburbs Magpies players
Australian rugby league players
Rugby league players from Sydney
Rugby league centres
Rugby league five-eighths